The golden-bellied flycatcher (Myiodynastes hemichrysus) is a passerine bird in the tyrant flycatcher family.  It is an endemic resident breeder in Costa Rica and western Panama.

This species is found in the canopy and at the edges of wet, epiphyte-draped mountain forests, especially near streams or clearings.  It occurs at middle elevations, typically between 700 and 1850 m altitude, locally to 2300 m in the south of its restricted range.

The nest is a shallow open cup placed in a tree hollow, old woodpecker nest, or clump of epiphytes, or a vegetation-covered vertical bank. The female lays a typical clutch of three pinkish eggs, which are marked with red-brown spots.

The golden-bellied flycatcher is 20 cm long, weighs 41g and has a black bill. Its crown is grey with a concealed yellow patch, and it has a black eyemask. The upperparts are dark olive, and the wings and tail are brown with faint rufous fringes.  The underparts are yellow and the throat is white with dark stripes down each side which distinguish it from similar species like social or gray-capped flycatchers. Young birds have paler yellow underparts, browner upperparts, no crown stripe, and more obvious chestnut fringes to the wing and tail feathers.

The call of the golden-bellied flycatcher is a squeaky seeeik and the dawn song is a melodious repeated tre-le-loo.

Golden-bellied flycatchers typically perch on a high watchpoint from which to sally forth and catch flying insects, but they eat a range other food items, including berries.

References

Further reading

golden-bellied flycatcher
Birds of the Talamancan montane forests
golden-bellied flycatcher